Ricky Ray Rector (January 12, 1950 – January 24, 1992) was an American convicted murderer who was executed for the 1981 murder of police officer Robert Martin in Conway, Arkansas. After killing a man in a restaurant and fleeing, Rector spent three days on the run before he agreed to turn himself in. However, instead of giving himself up, he shot the police officer who had negotiated his surrender in the back. He then shot himself in the head in a suicide attempt. The attempt effectively resulted in a lobotomy.

A 1991 request for a writ of certiorari to the Supreme Court was denied, with Justice Thurgood Marshall dissenting. Despite Rector's mental state, then-Arkansas Governor Bill Clinton made a point of returning to Arkansas to oversee Rector's January 24, 1992, execution during the 1992 U.S. presidential election campaign.

Murders and trial
On March 21, 1981, Rector and some friends drove to a dance hall at Tommy's Old-Fashioned Home-Style Restaurant in Conway. When one friend who could not pay the $3 cover charge was refused entry, Rector became incensed and pulled a .38 caliber pistol from his waist band. He fired several shots, wounding two and killing a third man named Arthur D. Criswell, who died almost instantly after being struck in the throat and forehead.

Rector left the scene of the murder in a friend's car and wandered the city for three days, staying in the woods or with relatives. On March 24, Rector's sister convinced him to turn himself in. Rector agreed to surrender, but only to Officer Robert Martin, whom he had known since he was a child.

Martin arrived at Rector's mother's home shortly after 3 p.m. and chatted with Rector's mother and sister. Shortly thereafter, Rector arrived and greeted Martin. As Martin turned away to continue his conversation with Rector's mother, Rector drew his pistol from behind his back and fired two shots into Martin, striking him in the jaw and neck. Rector then turned and walked out of the house.

Once he had walked past his mother's backyard, Rector put his gun to his own temple and fired. Rector was quickly discovered by other police officers and taken to the local hospital. The shot had destroyed Rector's frontal lobe.

Rector survived the surgery and was put on trial for the murders of Criswell and Martin. His defense attorneys argued that Rector was intellectually impaired and not competent to stand trial. However, after hearing conflicting testimony from several experts who had evaluated Rector, Judge George F. Hartje ruled that Rector was competent to stand trial. Rector was convicted on both counts and sentenced to death.

Execution
Rector was subject to a unique overlap of controversies in 1992, during his execution in Arkansas. An oft-cited example of his mental insufficiency is his decision to save the dessert from his last meal "for later," which would have been after his execution. In 2002, the U.S. Supreme Court banned the execution of people with intellectual disabilities in Atkins v. Virginia, ruling that the practice constitutes cruel and unusual punishment.

Last meal
For his last meal, Rector requested and received a steak, fried chicken, cherry Kool-Aid, and pecan pie. As noted above, Rector left the pie on the side of the tray, telling the corrections officers who came to take him to the execution chamber that he was "saving it for later." The slice of pecan pie was not disposed of until Rector had been executed.

Execution
Rector was executed by lethal injection. It took medical staff more than fifty minutes to find a suitable vein. The curtain remained closed between Rector and the witnesses, but some reported they could hear Rector moaning. The administrator of the State Department of Corrections Medical Program said "the moans did come as a team of two medical people—that had grown to five—worked on both sides of his body to find a vein. That may have contributed to his occasional outbursts." The state later attributed the difficulty in finding a suitable vein to Rector's great weight and to his having been administered an antipsychotic medication.

Rector was the third person executed by the state of Arkansas since Furman v. Georgia, after new capital punishment laws were passed in Arkansas, which came into force on March 23, 1973.

Role in 1992 presidential campaign
By 1992, Bill Clinton was insisting that Democrats "should no longer feel guilty about protecting the innocent" and indicated his support of capital punishment. To make his point, he flew home to Arkansas mid-campaign to affirm that the execution would continue as scheduled. Some pundits considered it a turning point in that race, hardening a soft public image. Others tend to cite the execution as an example of what they perceive to be Clinton's opportunism, directly influenced by the failed presidential campaign of Michael Dukakis, who was portrayed by Republicans as soft on crime.

Bill Clinton's critics from the anti-capital punishment sector have seen the case of Rector as an unpleasant example of what they view as Clinton's cynical careerism. The writer Christopher Hitchens, in particular, devotes much of a chapter of his book on Clinton, No One Left to Lie To, for what he regards as the immorality of the then Democratic candidate's decision to condone, and take political advantage of, Rector's execution. Hitchens argues that among other actions, Clinton was attempting to deflect attention from the ongoing Gennifer Flowers sex scandal.

See also 
 Capital punishment in Arkansas
 Capital punishment in the United States
 List of people executed in Arkansas

References 

1950 births
1992 deaths
1981 murders in the United States
20th-century executions by Arkansas
American people executed for murdering police officers
Executed African-American people
People convicted of murder by Arkansas
People executed by Arkansas by lethal injection
People from Conway, Arkansas
20th-century executions of American people
People with traumatic brain injuries
20th-century American criminals
American male criminals
Lobotomised people